The Rapid Deployment Forces (RDF) are one of the branches of the Egyptian Armed Forces. It was formed in March 2014 by the former defense minister field marshal Abdel Fattah al-Sisi. It was formed due to the increasing threat of terrorist organizations in Libya. It is mainly airborne troops with a special formation, and it is characterized by the ability to perform operations inside and outside the Egyptian mainland. It comprises the most efficient elements of the Sa'ka Forces, mechanized infantry, armored corps, air defense, artillery and anti-tank teams, it also includes military police, special reconnaissance teams, and a number of fighter jets.

History
The Egyptian Rapid Deployment Forces were formed in 2014. Its first deployment was in Sinai after the October 2014 attacks.

References

Military units and formations of Egypt
Military units and formations established in 2014
2014 establishments in Egypt